Hello Naan Pei Pesuren is a 2016 Indian Tamil language comedy horror film written and directed by S. Baskar and produced by Sundar C., under the banner Avni Cine Makers. Music was composed by Siddharth Vipin, cinematography was handled by Banu Murugan and editing by N. B. Srikanth. Vaibhav plays the male lead, Oviya and Aishwarya Rajesh are the two female leads, and VTV Ganesh and Karunakaran play supporting roles. In the film, the hero interacts with a ghost when he accidentally finds a 'horror-filled' mobile phone. The film released on 1 April 2016.

Cast

Vaibhav as Amudhan
Oviya as Sreedevi
Aishwarya Rajesh as Kavitha
VTV Ganesh as Vajram, Kavitha's brother
Karunakaran as Dr. Saravanan
Jangiri Madhumitha as Saravanan's wife
Yogi Babu as Street Singer
Vichu Vishwanath as Gym Manager
Thalapathy Dinesh as Thimingalam
Siddharth Vipin as Seth
Singampuli as Game Samy
Ganeshkar as Cook
Singapore Deepan as Vavval, Kavitha's brother
Bava Lakshmanan
Thanjai Mahendran 
Mippu

Soundtrack

Music and soundtracks were composed Vallavanukku Pullum Aayudham fame Siddharth Vipin. The soundtrack features five songs, the lyrics for which are written by Mohan Rajan and Prabha. Behindwoods rated the album 2 out of 5 and called it "Stays true to the horror genre but lacks a punch!."

Release
The satellite rights of the film were sold to Sun TV.

Critical reception
The Hindu wrote "So, to summarise, yes, Hello Naan Pei Pesuren is a horror-comedy indeed." Times of India wrote "Hello Naan Pei Pesuren (HNPP) is a ghost movie but director Baskar is more interested in mining laughs than scares, and somehow, this approach actually benefits the film. The fact that HNPP manages to click even though horror comedies have become quite common these days should tell you how effective the comedy is."

References

External links
 

2016 films
2010s Tamil-language films
2016 comedy horror films
Indian comedy horror films
2016 directorial debut films
Films scored by Siddharth Vipin
2016 comedy films